Eszter Molnár (born 27 November 1978) is a Hungarian former professional tennis player. In her career, she won a total of 11 ITF titles and reached a doubles ranking high of world No. 192 on 18 February 2002.

ITF Circuit finals

Singles: 12 (7 titles, 5 runner-ups)

Doubles: 13 (4 titles, 9 runner-ups)

External links
 
 

1978 births
Living people
Hungarian female tennis players